The Association of Public and Land-grant Universities (APLU) is a research, policy, and advocacy organization of public research universities, land-grant institutions, state university systems, and higher education organizations. It has member campuses in all of the United States as well as the District of Columbia, four U.S. territories, Canada, and Mexico.

Membership

The association has more than 250 members including: all land-grant institutions; R1 and R2 public research universities;  state university systems; and affiliated organizations.  These institutions include 79 U.S. land-grant institutions, 19 of which are among the 23 historically black colleges and universities that are APLU members.  There are also eight Canadian and five Mexican public research universities.

Membership involvement
APLU members serve on councils and commissions. APLU Councils are composed of university administrators with similar job functions who come together to address critical issues and expand their knowledge base within their professional area of expertise. APLU Commissions cut across job function to enable individuals from multiple disciplines across universities to address critical issues and expand their knowledge base in areas of common interest.

Membership criteria
Membership in APLU is automatically granted to land-grant institutions per the Morrill Land-Grant Acts of 1862, 1890, and 1994.  Public universities classified among "R1: Doctoral Universities – Very high research activity" or "R2: Doctoral Universities – High research activity" are also eligible for membership.

History
The roots of APLU were established in October 1887 as the American Association of Agricultural Colleges and Experiment Stations, making it North America's oldest higher education association. The first annual convention was held that year in Washington, D.C. at the U.S. Department of Agriculture (USDA), and Pennsylvania State University president George W. Atherton was elected president of the Board of Directors. Through the years, APLU has undergone a number of name changes to reflect its growing public higher education mission. In 1919, the Land-Grant Colleges Engineering Association merged with the association. A few years later in 1926, the organization changed its name to the Association of Land-Grant Colleges and Universities. In 1963, the American Association of Land-Grant Colleges and Universities merged with the National Association of State Universities to form the National Association of State Universities and Land-Grant Colleges (NASULGC). On March 30, 2009, the association adopted its current name—Association of Public and Land-grant Universities.

Organizational structure

Association leadership
In 2022, former Georgia State University President Mark P. Becker became the fourth president of APLU.

Board of directors
The 26-member Board of Directors is the governing body of the association.

References

External links
Official website

College and university associations and consortia in the United States
Organizations established in 1887
1887 establishments in the United States